Forbes River may refer to:
Forbes River (New South Wales), a tributary of Hastings River in Australia
Forbes River (New Zealand), a tributary of Havelock River in New Zealand
Forbes River (Quebec), a tributary of Caniapiscau River in Canada